The Belgian State Railways Type 28 was a class of  steam locomotives for freight service, introduced in 1864.

Construction history
The locomotives were built from 1864 to 1883 by various Belgian manufacturers, with additionally 9 machines built by Schneider - Le Creusot and 10 machines built by Maschinenbau-Gesellschaft Karlsruhe.
The machines used a Belpaire firebox and had an outside frame with the cylinders and the Stephenson valve gear located inside the frame.

In 1889, 1896 and 1898 the machines received new boilers. Also the Arsenal of Mechelen transformed several old Type 30 and 33 into Type 28bis.

Several machines were rebuilt as Type 29, Type 2 and Type 2bis.

Notes

References

Bibliography

0-6-0 locomotives
Steam locomotives of Belgium
Standard gauge locomotives of Belgium
C n2 locomotives
Railway locomotives introduced in 1864
Cockerill locomotives
Franco-Belge locomotives